This is a list of eggplant dishes. This list includes dishes in which the main ingredient or one of the essential ingredients is eggplant. Eggplant or aubergine is used in the cuisine of many countries. It is often stewed, as in the French ratatouille, or deep fried as in the Italian parmigiana di melanzane, the Turkish karnıyarık or Turkish and Greek musakka/moussaka, and Middle-Eastern and South Asian dishes. Eggplants can also be battered before deep-frying and served with a sauce made of tahini and tamarind. In Iranian cuisine, it is blended with whey as kashk e-bademjan, tomatoes as mirza ghasemi or made into stew as khoresh-e-bademjan. It can be sliced and deep-fried, then served with plain yogurt, (optionally) topped with a tomato and garlic sauce, such as in the Turkish dish patlıcan kızartması (meaning: fried aubergines) or without yogurt as in patlıcan şakşuka. Perhaps the best-known Turkish eggplant dishes are imam bayıldı (vegetarian) and karnıyarık (with minced meat).

Eggplant dishes

 
 
 
 
 
 
 
 , a pickled aubergine characteristic of "Manchega" cuisine from the Castile-La Mancha region of Spain, specifically from Almagro, a city in the Ciudad Real province of Spain.
 
 
 
 
 
 
  – includes many dishes from various cultures
 
 
 
 
 
 
 
 
 
 
 Mesa’ah - Egyptian fried eggplant made with tomato sauce, garlic, and onions eaten cold
 
 
 
 
 Pasta alla Norma
 

 
 
 
 
 
 
 
 
 
 

 Tepsi baytinijan – an Iraqi casserole dish consisting of eggplants, which are sliced and fried before placing in a baking dish, accompanied with meatballs, tomatoes, onions and garlic.

See also
 List of vegetable dishes
 List of foods

References

External links

 
 Traditional Recipe for Eggplant Parmesan from Dining Mosaic

 
Eggplant